The Chief Theater in Gallup, New Mexico is an Art Deco-style theatre built in 1920.  It was listed on the National Register of Historic Places in 1988.  It was then occupied by the City Electric Shoe Shop.  

More specifically, the style of its facade is a Southwest regional Art Deco substyle, regionally referred to as Pueblo Deco.

References

		
National Register of Historic Places in McKinley County, New Mexico
Pueblo Deco architecture
Buildings and structures completed in 1920
1920 establishments in New Mexico